Mo Teh-hui (1883 in Xinjiang Province, Qing Dynasty – April 17, 1968 in Taipei, Taiwan) was a nationalist Chinese politician.

Biography
Mo was born on the ninth year of Guangxu (光緒九年, 癸亥, 1883) in Xinjiang (新疆), to a Uighur mother and Manchu father. He was born while his father was serving under General Zuo Zongtang in the Dungan revolt (1862–77), fighting against Yaqub Beg in Xinjiang. Mo's family then moved to a part of Jilin province which is now in modern-day Heilongjiang province. Mo's political career started in 1921, in Binjiang County (near Harbin) of Manchuria. As the county magistrate, Mo divided the county into five defense districts coterminous with the regular police districts, and recruited men into the constabulary to defend the whole county against bandits.  He held that post until 1912, when he was elected to the provisional National Assembly of the newly established Republic of China.

He was Acting Minister of Agriculture and Commerce (1925) and Minister of Agriculture and Industry (1927–28) of China and, in the interim, served as the Civil Governor of Fengtian (Liaoning) (1926–27).  In the Huanggutun Incident of 1928, he was on the same train with Marshall Zhang Zuolin and fortunately escaped with only a leg injury.

Following the reorganization of the Chinese Eastern Railway in 1929 and after the conclusion of the Sino-Russian complications, Mo was appointed president of the Board of Directors ("duban") of the railway. He was later appointed as the official representative of the Mukden (Shenyang) and Nanking Government for the purpose of negotiating a settlement of outstanding problems pertaining to the administration of the C.E.R. He was appointed plenipotentiary delegate to the Sino-Russian Conference at Moscow in May 1930. Mo visited USSR for up to 25 talks, but returned to China in December 1930 due to a deadlock of the conference. After Japan's Invasion of Manchuria on September 18, 1931, the USSR sold its interests in C.E.R. to Japan's puppet state Manchukuo.

In 1938, Mo became a nonpartisan member of the National Political Council (國民參政會) at Chungking, the National Government's wartime seat, and was named chairman of the council's presidium in 1942. After the War, he served as a nonpartisan delegate to the Political Consultative Conference (政治協商會議). He was also a delegate to the National Assembly when it reconvened later in 1946, and was elected vice chairman of the commission for the supervision of the enforcement of constitutional government, becoming its chairman in September 1948. He served on the State Council (國民政府委員會) in 1947-48, and ran for the Vice Presidency of the Republic of China in 1948. He was appointed as the president of the Examination Yuan, after the Kuomintang retreated from the mainland to the island of Taiwan (1954–66).

See also 
 Warlord era
 Central Plains War
 Mukden Incident
 Xi'an incident
 Chiang Kai-shek
 Madame Chiang Kai-shek
 History of the Republic of China
 National Revolutionary Army
 Whampoa Military Academy
 Second Sino-Japanese War
 Military of the Republic of China
 Politics of the Republic of China
 Sino-German cooperation (1911–1941)
 Chinese nationalism

References

External links

rulers.org
Ministries 1912-28
http://www.republicanchina.org/campaign.html-republican china
http://www.historycooperative.org/journals/jsh/40.1/shan.html-Insecurity, Outlawry and Social Order: Banditry in China'S Heilongjiang Frontier Region, 1900–1931
http://www.encyclopedia.com/doc/1G1-152922866.html-HigBeam Encyclopedia
http://www.worldstatesmen.org/China_prov.html-Provinces and Administrative Divisions of China
http://lib-ap-svr.exam.gov.tw/ccdb2/Result_List.
http://beijingspring.com/big5bjs/bjs/bc/150/68.txt
張學良為何拒絕恢復自由

1883 births
1968 deaths
Kuomintang politicians in Taiwan
Republic of China politicians from Xinjiang
Chinese police officers
Taiwanese Presidents of the Examination Yuan
Senior Advisors to President Chiang Kai-shek
Chinese Civil War refugees
Taiwanese people from Xinjiang
Uyghur people
Manchu politicians